is a Japanese volleyball player who played for Toray Arrows. She announced her retirement on 27 May, 2010. She participated in the 2010 Asian Women's Volleyball Cup.

Profiles
When attending high school, Saori Kimura was a classmate. She later became a teammate at Toray Arrows.

Clubs 
 ShimokitazawaSeitoku high school
 Toray Arrows (2005–2010)

Awards

Team 
2007 Domestic Sports Festival (Volleyball) -  Champion, with Toray Arrows
2007-2008 Empress's Cup -   Champion, with Toray Arrows
2007-2008 V.Premier League -  Champion, with Toray Arrows
2008 Domestic Sports Festival -  Runner-Up, with Toray Arrows
2008-2009 V.Premier League -  Champion, with Toray Arrows
2009 Kurowashiki All Japan Volleyball Championship -  Champion, with Toray Arrows
2009-2010 V.Premier League -  Champion, with Toray Arrows
2010 Kurowashiki All Japan Volleyball Championship -  Champion, with Toray Arrows

References

External links
Toray Arrows Women's Volleyball Team

Japanese women's volleyball players
Living people
People from Tokyo
1986 births
Volleyball players at the 2018 Asian Games
Asian Games competitors for Japan